is a Japanese manga series written and illustrated by Yumiko Ōshima. It was adapted into a live action film in 2008. It was further adapted into a Japanese television drama broadcast by WOWOW. Season 1 of the drama aired in the fall of 2014  and Season 2 aired in the summer of 2016.

Characters
Asako Oshima (played by Kyōko Koizumi in the film and by Rie Miyazawa in the TV series)
Naomi (played by Juri Ueno)
Seiji Sawamura (played by Ryo Kase)
Mamoru (played by Naojiro Hayashi)
Tatsuya (played by Tatsuya Isaka)
Ça Va (played by Suzuka Ohgo)
Taisuke Yamamoto (played by Asei Kobayashi)
Asako's mother (played by Chieko Matsubara)
Kyoko (played by Ai Takabe)
Erika (played by Elisa Yanagi)
Michiko (played by Kazuko Kurosawa)
Sakie (played by Tomoko Murakami)
Kanako (played by Miyuki Oshima)
Umezu (played by Kazuo Umezu)
Paul Weinberg (played by Marty Friedman)
Karin Uno, Koichi Masuno, and additional actors

Reception
Gou-Gou Datte Neko De Aru (Cher Gou-Gou…mon petit chat, mon petit ami) won the Short Award Prize at the 12th Tezuka Osamu Cultural Prize in 2008.

References

External links

2014 Japanese television series debuts
Television series about cats
Manga adapted into films
Wowow original programming
Films directed by Isshin Inudo
Japanese drama films